Chippewa Falls is a city located on the Chippewa River in Chippewa County in the northwestern part of the U.S. state of Wisconsin. The population was 14,778 in the 2021 census. Incorporated as a city in 1869, it is the county seat of Chippewa County.

The city's name originated from its location on the Chippewa River, which is named after the Ojibwe Native Americans. Chippewa is an alternative rendition of Ojibwe.

Chippewa Falls is the birthplace of Seymour Cray, known as the "father of supercomputing", and the headquarters for the original Cray Research. It is also the home of the Jacob Leinenkugel Brewing Company, the Heyde Center for the Arts, a showcase venue for artists and performers; Irvine Park, and the annual Northern Wisconsin State Fair.

History
For thousands of years the Chippewa River was a water highway through a wilderness of forests and swamps, travelled by Ojibwe people, Lakota and others. More recently, Indians guided European explorers up the river and around the Falls. Pierre LeSueur "discovered" the Chippewa Spring in 1700 when this area was part of New France. Jonathan Carver traveled up the river with his party in 1768 when the area was claimed by Britain.

White settlement of the Chippewa Falls area began in 1838, when Lyman Warren and his mostly-Chippewa wife started a farm and blacksmith shop five miles above the Falls. As agreed at the 1825 treaty of Prairie du Chien, Warren was to act as a sub-agent for the U.S. government to the Chippewas. Intertwined with that, Warren's farm served as a trading post for the American Fur Company.

The Chippewa River's watershed held a huge amount of valuable timber - more than the Wisconsin River, and before railroad and roads, the only way to transport much of it out was down the river, through what would become Chippewa Falls. When the 1837 Treaty of St. Peters opened this part of northern Wisconsin to logging, Jean Brunett led a team up the Chippewa River to build a sawmill at the Falls. With great effort and expense, they managed to build the first mill there. It survived until June of 1846, when a storm flooded the river and destroyed most of the millworks. The mill was rebuilt quickly and sawing resumed.

A settlement grew around the sawmill at the Falls, and in 1854 Chippewa Falls was chosen to be the seat of Chippewa County. A school, a post office, a mercantile store, the first churches, and the first newspaper had all opened by 1857. The city incorporated in 1869 with about 2,500 people. In the 1870s boardwalks were added along Bridge Street, gas streetlights were installed, and a telephone line was run up from Eau Claire.

Railroads also arrived in the 1870s. In 1870, the West Wisconsin Railway had built a line from St. Paul, Minnesota, to Milwaukee, running ten miles to the south through Eau Claire. In 1875 the Eau Claire and Chippewa Falls Railway connected that line from Eau Claire to Chippewa Falls. In 1880, the CF&W was joined by the Wisconsin and Minnesota Railway pushing its way west from Abbotsford. This was followed in 1881 by the Chippewa Falls & Northern Railroad, which built a line north from Chippewa Falls to Bloomer, eventually extending it to Superior.

Lumbering continued to grow. By the 1880s the Chippewa valley held the best stand of white pine left in the Midwest. The sawmill at Chippewa Falls was run by the Chippewa Lumber and Boom Company, and the company's logging crews cut trees on their lands upstream in winter and drove logs down to the sawmill at the Falls each spring. The company employed 400 people and the mill at Chippewa was said to be "the largest sawmill under one roof in the world."

The Chippewa Spring gained renewed attention in 1887 when politician Thaddeus C. Pound founded the Chippewa Springs Health Club, and at one point oversaw the company that bottled the spring water for sale. A Spring House was built over the original spring in 1893. It remains today, across from the modern water bottling plant on Park Ave.

Other industries started in the 1880s and 1890s: flour mills, a brewery, a woolen mill, cigar factories, a shoe factory, and a broom factory. By 1902 it had become clear that the pineries were not as inexhaustible as many had thought, and a group of business leaders began to promote more diverse industries. They succeeded in starting more shoe factories, a sugar beet factory, and a glove factory. The big sawmill closed in 1911, but the other industries kept the community going. By 1920 the city had fifty manufacturers who employed 3,000 workers.

Geography
Chippewa Falls is located along the north bank of the Chippewa River approximately three miles west of Lake Wissota.

Climate

Demographics

2020 census
As of the census of 2020, the population was 14,731. The racial makeup of the city was 90.1% White, 1.9% Black or African American, 1.3% Asian, 0.7% Native American, 0.7% from other races, and 5.2% from two or more races. Ethnically, the population was 2.5% Hispanic or Latino of any race.

2010 census
As of the census of 2010, there were 13,661 people, 5,896 households, and 3,275 families living in the city. The racial makeup of the city was 95.1% White, 1.7% African American, 0.7% Native American, 0.9% Asian, 0.2% from other races, and 1.4% from two or more races. Hispanic or Latino of any race were 1.6% of the population.

There were 5,896 households, of which 29.1% had children under the age of 18 living with them, 37.7% were married couples living together, 13.0% had a female householder with no husband present, 4.9% had a male householder with no wife present, and 44.5% were non-families. 37.6% of all households were made up of individuals, and 16.7% had someone living alone who was 65 years of age or older. The average household size was 2.18 and the average family size was 2.86.

The median age in the city was 38 years. 22.9% of residents were under the age of 18; 9.1% were between the ages of 18 and 24; 27.1% were from 25 to 44; 24.6% were from 45 to 64; and 16.4% were 65 years of age or older. The gender makeup of the city was 50.7% male and 49.3% female.

2000 census
At the 2000 census, there were 12,925 people, 5,638 households and 3,247 families living in the city. The population density was 1,191.2 per square mile (459.9/km2). There were 5,905 housing units at an average density of 544.2 per square mile (210.1/km2). The racial makeup of the city was 97.62% White, 0.30% African American, 0.46% Native American, 0.67% Asian, 0.01% Pacific Islander, 0.16% from other races, and 0.77% from two or more races. Hispanic or Latino of any race were 0.63% of the population.

There were 5,638 households, of which 28.8% had children under the age of 18 living with them, 42.4% were married couples living together, 11.3% had a female householder with no husband present, and 42.4% were non-families. 36.5% of all households were made up of individuals, and 16.4% had someone living alone who was 65 years of age or older. The average household size was 2.20 and the average family size was 2.89.

Age distribution was 24.2% under the age of 18, 9.4% from 18 to 24, 28.2% from 25 to 44, 20.3% from 45 to 64, and 17.9% who were 65 years of age or older. The median age was 37 years. For every 100 females, there were 89.5 males. For every 100 females age 18 and over, there were 85.2 males.

The median household income was $32,744, and the median family income was $43,519. Males had a median income of $32,016 versus $22,655 for females. The per capita income for the city was $18,366. About 8.7% of families and 10.3% of the population were below the poverty line, including 15.5% of those under age 18 and 5.8% of those age 65 or over.

Economy

As of 2011, the largest employers in the city were:

Infrastructure
Chippewa Falls is along U.S. Highway 53, Wisconsin Highways 124 and 178, and Bus. WIS 29. Other routes include Wisconsin Highway 29; and County Highways J, Q, S, and X.

Education

The Chippewa Falls Area School District (CFSD) serves the city of Chippewa Falls. It has two high schools: Chippewa Falls Senior High and Chippewa Falls Alternate High School; two middle schools: Chippewa Falls Middle School, and Chippewa Falls Alternate Middle School; and six elementary schools: Parkview, Hillcrest, Southview, Stillson, Halmstad, and Jim Falls Elementary.

In addition there are several parochial schools: McDonell Central Catholic High School, Notre Dame Middle School, Holy Ghost, St. Charles, and St. Peter Elementary Schools, all of which are part of the McDonell Area Catholic Schools (MACS).

The original McDonell High School building, constructed at a prominent location above downtown Chippewa Falls, is listed on the State and National Register of Historic Places. The structure was built in 1907. After the high school was relocated to a new building in a more suburban location, this structure was vacant for several years. It was taken over by the Chippewa Valley Cultural Association and converted into the Heyde Center for the Arts in 2000.

Notable people

Politicians

 Edward Ackley, member of the Wisconsin State Senate
 William B. Bartlett, member of the Wisconsin State Assembly
 Howard W. Cameron, member of the Wisconsin State Senate
 Wilder W. Crane, Jr., member of the Wisconsin State Assembly
 Gary Grant, member of the Washington House of Representatives
 Leo Richard Hamilton, member of the Wisconsin State Assembly
 Thomas S. Hogan, Montana Secretary of State
 John J. Jenkins, U.S. Representative
 Henry Laycock, member of the Wisconsin State Assembly
 Dick Leinenkugel, a politician and businessman with Leinenkugels.  Served as the Wisconsin Secretary of Commerce under governor Jim Doyle
 Hector McRae, member of the Wisconsin State Assembly
 Charles F. Morris, member of the Wisconsin State Assembly
 Terry Moulton, a politician and member of the Wisconsin State Senate
 Arthur L. Padrutt, member of the Wisconsin State Senate
 Bruce Peloquin, member of the Wisconsin State Senate
 Bradley Phillips, member of the Wisconsin State Assembly
 Thaddeus C. Pound, U.S. Representative, grandfather of poet Ezra Pound
 Ingolf E. Rasmus, lawyer and member of the Wisconsin State Assembly
 Marvin J. Roshell, member of the Wisconsin State Senate
 Lycurgus J. Rusk, member of the Wisconsin State Assembly
 Chuck Schafer, member of the Wisconsin State Assembly
 Tom Sykora, elected to Wisconsin State Assembly in 1994 and served until retirement in 2003
 John W. Thomas, member of the Wisconsin State Assembly
 Alexander Wiley, served four terms in the United States Senate for the state of Wisconsin from 1939 to 1963
 Terry A. Willkom, member of the Wisconsin State Assembly
 Cadwallader Jackson Wiltse, member of the Wisconsin State Assembly

Military

 Irving J. Carr, U.S. Army Major General
 Richard H. Cosgriff, Medal of Honor recipient
 Horace Ellis, Medal of Honor recipient
 George Clay Ginty, Union Army general
 James J. LeCleir, U.S. Air Force Major General
 Charles E. Mower, United States Army soldier and Medal of Honor recipient in World War II
 Dennis B. Sullivan, U.S. Air Force Brigadier General

Sports

 Moose Baxter, John Morris Baxter, former Major League Baseball player
 Chad Cascadden, National Football League linebacker for New York Jets and New England Patriots 1995-99
 Art Crews, professional wrestler, now Jail Captain with Chippewa County Sheriff's Department
 Nate DeLong, National Basketball Association player
 Charles E. "Gus" Dorais (1891–1954), quarterback and kicker for the University of Notre Dame; inducted in College Football Hall of Fame as a coach in 1954; head coach of Detroit Lions from 1943–1947
 Gene Ellenson, professional football player in 1946
 Joe Vavra, player for Los Angeles Dodgers, coach for Minnesota Twins; enshrined in Chi-Hi Athletic Hall of Fame on August 27, 2010

Law

 Russell G. Cleary, businessman and lawyer
 Thomas Eugene Grady, Justice of the Washington Supreme Court
 Donald F. Turner, lawyer and economist, Assistant Attorney General in charge of USDOJ's Antitrust Division under President Lyndon Baines Johnson

Other

 Andrew S. Cray, LGBT Rights Activist
 Seymour Cray (1925–1996), electrical engineer and supercomputer architect who founded Cray Research
 Annie Hall, fictional protagonist in the movie Annie Hall (1977).

 Judy Henske, singer and songwriter, "Queen of the Beatniks"; songs about Chippewa roots include "The Ballad of Seymour Cray"
 William F. Kirk (1877–1927), nationally syndicated columnist, poet, songwriter, humorist and baseball writer
 Howard "Guitar" Luedtke, blues guitarist, singer, songwriter and musician who tours with his band, Howard "Guitar" Luedtke & Blue Max
 Eddy Waller (1889–1977), actor who appeared in over 200 films between 1929 and 1963
Jack Dawson (1892–1912), fictional victim of the RMS Titanic sinking
 Dr. Jennifer Keller, fictional character from Stargate Atlantis, was born in Chippewa Falls. 
 Grand Slam , fictional character from the G.I. Joe: A Real American Hero toyline and comic series, was born in Chippewa Falls.

Important structures

Notes

External links

 Chippewa Falls, Wisconsin
 Chippewa Falls Area Chamber of Commerce
 Chippewa Falls Museum of Industry and Technology

Cities in Chippewa County, Wisconsin
Cities in Wisconsin
County seats in Wisconsin
Eau Claire–Chippewa Falls metropolitan area
1869 establishments in Wisconsin